This article features the 2005 CONCACAF U-20 Tournament qualifying stage. Caribbean and Central American teams entered in separate tournaments. The North American teams Canada and Mexico automatically qualified, as well as main tournament hosts Honduras (Central America) and the United States (North America). Nineteen Caribbean teams entered, of which two qualified and five Central American teams entered, of which two qualified.

Caribbean

Preliminary round

|}

Group stage

Group A
All matches were played in Trinidad and Tobago.

Group B
All matches were played in Jamaica.

Group C
All matches were played in the Netherlands Antilles.

Group D
All matches were played in Cuba. Saint Martin withdrew.

Final round
In this round, Haiti withdrew after one match. The second match was awarded to Jamaica 3–0.

|}

Central America
Belize withdrew in this group.

Qualified for Main Tournament
  (Caribbean winners)
  (Caribbean winners)
  (Central American winners)
  (Central American runners-up)

See also
 2005 CONCACAF U-20 Tournament

External links
Results by RSSSF

CONCACAF U-20 Championship qualification
qual
2005 in youth association football